Woman with Basket of Beans in the Kitchen Garden (1651 or 1661) is an oil-on-canvas painting by the Dutch painter Pieter de Hooch. It is an example of Dutch Golden Age painting and is now in the Kunstmuseum Basel.

Description 
This painting was documented by Peter C. Sutton in 1980, who felt the date of 1651 was too early and that the "5" was written suspiciously heavily leading him to date it tentatively as 1661. He also compared the painting to other paintings of gardens that De Hooch made in the early 1660s and remarked that the man's portrait on the window shutter in the foreground only appeared after the painting was cleaned at some point during the years 1913–1927.

Depending on the year, the painting depicts a garden in Delft or Amsterdam, but in any case this scene's narrow garden is very similar to narrow gardens of other paintings De Hooch made:

References

1650s paintings
Paintings by Pieter de Hooch
Paintings in the collection of the Kunstmuseum Basel